Thracian clothing refers to types of clothing worn mainly by Thracians, Dacians but also by some Greeks. Its best literal descriptions are given by Herodotus and Xenophon in his Anabasis. Depictions are found in a great number of Greek vases and there are a few Persian representations as well. In contrast to shapes and patterns we have very little evidence on the colours used.

History and types 
The Thracians wore a tunic, a cloak called zeira (Ancient Greek: ζείρα), a cap called alopekis (Ancient Greek: αλωπεκίς) made from the scalp of a fox with the ears visible, other Phrygian cap styles, and fawnskin boots called embades (Ancient Greek: εμβάδες). Thracian clothing was sometimes decorated with intricate patterns. While patterned clothing was not unique to Thracians, the zeira, embades and the alopekis probably originated from them. Clothing was made from hemp, flax or wool. The Dacians and the Getae wore pantaloons called bracae (Ancient Greek: ἀναξυρίδες or θύλακοι).These loose pants were described in Euripides work as “variegated bags” (Ancient Greek: τοὺς θυλάκους τοὺς ποικίλους)  and may have appeared highly ridiculous to the Greeks, although Ovid mentions the adoption of them by the descendants of some of the Greek colonists on the Euxine.These trousers were common in many nations.

Classical era

In the north only noble Thracians, the "Zibythides" and noble Dacians, the "Pileati", would wear caps. Despite this Herodotus writes that all Thracians in the Persian army wore foxskin caps and multicoloured mantles. Northern tribes in general, both Thracians and Daco-Getians, wore clothes similar to Scythians.

Hellenistic era
The Thracians at Pydna in 168 BC wore black tunics. The Kausia (Ancient Greek: Καυσία) was adopted from the Macedonians. Although many Thracian tribes began to incorporate Greek garbs to their fashion, they still largely retained their own styles of clothing.

See also 
Clothing in the ancient world
Dacian bracelets

References

External links 

Thracian man
Warrior in Thracian costume
Youths getting dressed in Thracian garbs

Clothing
Clothing by ethnicity
History of clothing
Greek clothing
Dacia
Dacian culture